Sport Vereniging Jong Rambaan is a Surinamese football club based in Lelydorp. The club presently competes in the Topklasse, the top tier of Surinamese football.

History
S.V. Jong Rambaan are a club from Lelydorp, Suriname who play at the LSB Stadion to a capacity of 1,000 people.

Honours 
Lidbondentoernooi: 1
 2014

Notable coaches
  Edmund Mohan Ramkisoen

References 

Jong Rambaan
Jong Rambaan
1944 establishments in Suriname